Lou Reed (born 10 September 1987) is a Wales international rugby union footballer. He previously played as a lock for Sale Sharks in the Premiership league. Reed is currently working as a representative for Heraeus Medical in South Wales, although occasionally still plays rugby in his free time.

Reed signed for the Scarlets on a professional development contract in March 2006, but only made five appearances in the 2006–07 season. In order to gain some experience of first-team rugby, Reed was loaned to Rotherham for a month in December 2007.

In May 2012 the press announced that Reed would join Cardiff Blues, and the move was confirmed on 8 June.

International

In June 2011 he was named in the Wales national rugby union team 45 man training squad for the 2011 Rugby World Cup. Reed made his full international debut for Wales versus Scotland on 12 February 2012 as a second-half replacement.

References

External links
Scarlets profile
Wales profile

1987 births
Living people
People educated at Treorchy Comprehensive School
Rotherham Titans players
Rugby union locks
Rugby union players from Treorchy
Scarlets players
Wales international rugby union players
Welsh rugby union players